Castlelost Castle is a ruined motte-and-bailey castle located in the townland of Castlelost, just north of Rochfortbridge in County Westmeath, Ireland. The castle dates to the Norman invasion of Ireland, with some sources dating its construction to the late 12th century and associating it with Hugh Tyrrel (died 1199). The castle remained within the Tyrrel family through the 16th century. During the 17th century, the castle and surrounding lands were lost by the Tyrrels during the Irish Rebellion of 1641 and subsequent Cromwellian conquest of Ireland.

The only visible features still on the site are the ruined tower house as well as a small nearby motte. The castle, its motte and the remnants of a nearby bailey (courtyard) are listed on the Record of Monuments and Places for County Westmeath.

See also
 Castlelost (civil parish)

References

Castles in Ireland
Castles in County Westmeath